Pristimantis penelopus is a species of frog in the family Strabomantidae.
It is endemic to Colombia.
Its natural habitats are tropical moist montane forests and rivers.
It is threatened by habitat loss. Habitat loss includes cutting down trees and wildfires.

References 

penelopus
Amphibians of Colombia
Endemic fauna of Colombia
Amphibians described in 1999
Taxonomy articles created by Polbot